Coronation Street is a British soap opera first broadcast on ITV on 9 December 1960. The following is a list of characters introduced in 2023, by order of first appearance.

Christina Boyd 

Christina Boyd, played by Amy Robbins, made her first appearance on 23 January 2023. She is introduced as the mother of established character Daisy Midgeley (Charlotte Jordan).

References 

Coronation_Street
2023
, Coronation Street